R. S. Raja Kannappan, formerly known as S. Kannappan, is an Indian Tamil Politician and Minister for Backward Classes Welfare  and the Khadii and Village Industries currently and also former Minister of Transport, Nationalised Transport, Motor Vehicles Act in the period  2021- March 2022  and also former Minister of Public Works, Highways and Electricity during 1991–1996.
He joined the party DMK in Feb. 2020.

Political career

He was elected to the Tamil Nadu legislative assembly as an Anna Dravida Munnetra Kazhagam (ADMK) candidate from Tiruppattur (194) constituency in 1991 election. He served as minister of Public Works during 1991–1996. 
He later founded the Makkal Tamil Desam (MTD) party.

The MTD contested the 2001 election as a junior partner in the Dravida Munnetra Kazhagam (DMK) led front. In 2006, Kannappan dissolved his party and joined the DMK. He contested and won the 2006 election from the Ilaiyangudi constituency as a DMK candidate. In February 2009 he resigned from DMK and as an MLA. He joined the ADMK and contested the 2009 Indian general elections from the Sivaganga parliamentary constituency. He was defeated by the Indian National Congress (INC) candidate P. Chidambaram in a close election.

Kannappan claimed that the BJP is attempting to saffronise the southern districts and polarise the voters on religious lines. He blamed the AIADMK leadership for aiding this situation. He then quit the AIADMK and decided to support the DMK-led front in the 2019 Lok Sabha elections.

Kannappan — together with his wife, mother, two brothers, two sisters and mother-in-law — were among several former ADMK legislators charged with having assets disproportionate to their known income by Tamil Nadu Police in June 2005. The issue had first been investigated in 1996 and all charges were dismissed by the courts in 2015 due to lack of evidence, by which time his wife and mother had died.

References 

All India Anna Dravida Munnetra Kazhagam politicians
State cabinet ministers of Tamil Nadu
Living people
Tamil Nadu MLAs 2006–2011
Dravida Munnetra Kazhagam politicians
Year of birth missing (living people)
Tamil Nadu MLAs 1991–1996
Tamil Nadu MLAs 2021–2026